Aulonothroscus distans is a species of small false click beetle in the family Throscidae. It is found in North America.

References

Further reading

 

Elateroidea
Articles created by Qbugbot
Beetles described in 1917